Charles Wilson Jr. (June 26, 1895 – December 15, 1965) was an American Negro league pitcher in the 1920s.

A native of Roanoke, Virginia, Wilson made his Negro leagues debut in 1920 with the Dayton Marcos. He went on to play for the Columbus Buckeyes and Detroit Stars, and finished his career with a short return stint in Dayton in 1926. Wilson died in Salem, Virginia in 1965 at age 70.

References

External links
 and Seamheads

1895 births
1965 deaths
Columbus Buckeyes (Negro leagues) players
Dayton Marcos players
Detroit Stars players
20th-century African-American sportspeople
Baseball pitchers